The Clarion Golden Eagles men's basketball team is a Division II basketball program that represents Pennsylvania Western University Clarion (known before July 2022 as Clarion University of Pennsylvania). The program has been in the NCCA Division II Tournament two times in its history in 1981 and 2001. They are currently coached by Marcess Williams.

Current coaching staff

Current roster

History

School records

Career leaders
Points Scored: Kwame Morton (2,543)
Rebounds: Terry Roseto (1,275)
Assists: Oronn Brown (631)
Steals: Oronn Brown (361)
Games Played: Dan Chojnacki (118)
Games Started: Terrance Vaughns (108)
Blocked Shots: Marvin Wells (98)

Single-season leaders
Points Scored: Kwame Morton (845, 1994)
Rebounds: Reggie Wells, (367, 1977)
Assists: Oronn Brown (173, 1996)
Steals: Oronn Brown (120, 1997)
Blocked Shots: Ian Whyte (48, 1994)

Single-game leaders
Points Scored: Kwame Morton (56, vs Slippery Rock 1994)
Rebounds: Quintus Teer (23, vs UDC 2011)
Assists: Dave Wojciechowski/R.C. Kehoe (14, vs Lake Erie/Roberts Wesleyan 1993/1998)
Steals: Ted Boyer (12, vs Mercyhurst 1989)
Blocked Shots: Ian Whyte (10, vs Saint Vincent 1993)

Season by season record

Championships and tournament runs

PSAC championships
Source
PSAC Championships (1): 2001
PSAC Tournament Appearances (23): 1971, 1973, 1977, 1979–86, 1997-05, 2007–08, 2010
PSAC West Championships (11): 1971, 1973, 1977, 1979–80, 1983–85, 1997, 2000, 2005

NCAA tournament
The Golden Eagles have appeared in the NCAA tournament 2 times. Their combined record is 1-2.

NAIA tournament
The Golden Eagles have appeared in the NAIA Tournament 3 times. Their combined record is 3-3.
Source
District 30 Tournament Appearances (2): 1952, 1953 
District 18 Tournament Appearances (10): 1966, 1971–74, 1976–80 
National Tournament Appearances (3):1953, 1977, 1980

References

External links
Official website

 
Clarion University of Pennsylvania